The Algerian ambassador in Beijing is the official representative of the Government in Algiers to the Government of the People's Republic of China.

List of representatives 

Algeria–China relations

References 

China
Algeria